The Beijing–Tibet Expressway, commonly abbreviated to Jingzang Expressway, also known as Beijing–Lhasa Expressway (Jingla Expressway) or China National Expressway 6, is part of the Chinese national expressway network and is planned to connect the nation's capital, Beijing, to the capital of the Tibet Autonomous Region, Lhasa.

It passes through seven of China's administrative regions, including the Beijing municipality, the province of Hebei, the autonomous regions of Inner Mongolia and Ningxia, the provinces of Gansu and Qinghai, and finally the Tibet Autonomous Region.

Passage

Beginning from Beijing and driving southwest to Lhasa, The expressway runs approximately  through Hebei, Inner Mongolia, Ningxia, Gansu and Qinghai, for a total of seven provincial-level divisions.  Excluding the two terminal points, it passes through the major cities of Zhangjiakou, Jining District, Hohhot, Bayannur, Wuhai, Yinchuan, Wuzhong, Baiyin, Lanzhou, Xining and Golmud.

As of August 2010, just over fifty percent of the expressway is open to traffic, which mainly comprises the stretch between Beijing and Xining. Like China National Highway 109 and the Qingzang railway, it is expected to pass west through Golmud before heading southwest into Tibet and Lhasa. Because of climatic conditions, this stretch of the expressway does not yet have a construction timetable.

As of 2019 the expressway is completed between Beijing and Golmud, and the section between Nagqu and Lhasa has completed in August 2021. The mountainous section between Golmud and Nagqu is not yet shown on maps, and reserved for future plans.

The G6 merges with the G7 in Huhhot and does not split until Linhe (now Baynnur).

Ningxia 
The expressway is of particular importance in Ningxia, where 86.7% of the urban population lives in cities along the expressway, and over 90% of the provincial GDP is generated in these cities. In 2020, a 2x4 lane bypass around Ningxia's capital Yinchuan was opened, and another   in Ningxia will be widened to 2x3 lanes.

Detailed itinerary

See also
 Badaling Expressway (part of the G6 in Beijing)
 Expressways of China
 Jingzhang Expressway (part of the G6 in Hebei)

References

06
Expressways in Beijing
Expressways in Hebei
Expressways in Inner Mongolia
Expressways in Ningxia
Expressways in Gansu
Expressways in Qinghai
Expressways in Tibet